Gradnje is a settlement in the Gorjanci Hills in the Municipality of Krško in eastern Slovenia. The area is part of the traditional region of Lower Carniola. It is now included with the rest of the municipality in the Lower Sava Statistical Region.

Name
The name of the settlement was changed from Gradinje to Gradnje in 1990.

Cultural heritage
There is a small chapel-shine in the settlement, dedicated to the Virgin Mary. It was built in the early 20th century.

References

External links
Gradnje on Geopedia

Populated places in the Municipality of Krško